Central constituency may refer to several Russian legislative constituencies:

Central constituency (Dagestan), no. 11
Central constituency (Kaliningrad Oblast), no. 98
Central constituency (Krasnoyarsk Krai), no. 55
Central constituency (Moscow), no. 208
Central constituency (Novosibirsk Oblast), no. 136
Central constituency (Omsk Oblast), no. 130, 1993–2007
Central constituency (Saint Petersburg), no. 216
Central constituency (Tatarstan), no. 31